is a former Japanese football player. She played for Japan national team.

Club career
Yanagita was born in Chigasaki on April 11, 1981. When she was a high school student, she played for NTV Beleza. In 2000, she graduated from high school and she joined Tasaki Perule FC. In 2006, she moved to Urawa Reds. She retired end of 2012 season. She played 239 matches at 3 clubs in L.League and she was selected Best Eleven 3 times (2006, 2009 and 2010).

National team career
In December 1997, when Yanagita was 16 years old, she was selected Japan national team for 1997 AFC Championship. At this competition, on December 5, she debuted and scored a goal against Guam. She was a member of Japan for 1999, 2003, 2007 World Cup, 2004 and 2008 Summer Olympics. She played 91 games and scored 11 goals for Japan until 2008.

National team statistics

International goals

References

External links

1981 births
Living people
Association football people from Kanagawa Prefecture
Japanese women's footballers
Japan women's international footballers
Nadeshiko League players
Nippon TV Tokyo Verdy Beleza players
Tasaki Perule FC players
Urawa Red Diamonds Ladies players
1999 FIFA Women's World Cup players
2003 FIFA Women's World Cup players
2007 FIFA Women's World Cup players
Olympic footballers of Japan
Footballers at the 2004 Summer Olympics
Footballers at the 2008 Summer Olympics
Asian Games medalists in football
Footballers at the 1998 Asian Games
Footballers at the 2002 Asian Games
Footballers at the 2006 Asian Games
Women's association football midfielders
Asian Games silver medalists for Japan
Asian Games bronze medalists for Japan
Medalists at the 1998 Asian Games
Medalists at the 2002 Asian Games
Medalists at the 2006 Asian Games